Dale "slade" Henson is a game designer who has worked primarily on role-playing games.

Career
When the Spelljammer line ended, slade came up with the idea of building a new setting on Jeff Grubb's first-edition Manual of the Planes (1987); a year later David Cook picked up the idea and developed Planescape (1993) as a result.

Henson's D&D design work included Monstrous Compendium Spelljammer Appendix (1990), Realmspace (1991), Monstrous Compendium Forgotten Realms Appendix II (1991), Howl From the North (1991), Book of Crypts (1991), Unsung Heroes (1992), The Magic Encyclopedia (1992), The Knight of Newts (1993), Blood Enemies: Abominations of Cerilia (1995), and Netheril: Empire of Magic (1996).

Henson also did significant work on TSR's Buck Rogers XXVC role-playing game, including the supplements Earth is the 25th Century (1990), Hardware (1992), and particularly No Humans Allowed (1992).

References

External links
 

American game designers
Dungeons & Dragons game designers
Living people
Place of birth missing (living people)
Year of birth missing (living people)